Dereli is a town and district of Giresun Province in the Black Sea region of Turkey. The mayor is Kazım Zeki Şenlikoğlu (AKP).

Dereli is a small town of 6,043 people in attractive countryside, in the valley of the Aksu Deresi and Akkaya River, inland 28 from Giresun on the road to Şebinkarahisar.

History
See Giresun for the history of this area, once occupied by the Hittites, Persians, Ancient Greek colonists from Miletos, Macedonians, Ancient Romans, Byzantines, Seljuk Turks, who settled in these valleys and arounds Muslim Kızılbaş, Turkmen Turks (Chepni) and finally the Ottoman Empire.

Places to see
Kümbet
Salon Çayırı
Aymaç
Karagöl

References

District

Populated places in Giresun Province
Districts of Giresun Province
Towns in Turkey